Li Wenliang (1985–2020) was a Chinese doctor who was the first person to warn China about the spread of COVID-19, as well as the potential for the disease to become a pandemic.

Li Wenliang may also refer to:

 Li Wenliang (chess player) (born 1967), Chinese chess player